Angel Egli, better known as Mimiks, is a Swiss musician with Spanish roots. He has won MTV Europe Music Awards for best Swiss act.

References

External links 
 Website
 Profil von Mimiks at Netlog
 

1991 births
Living people
Swiss rappers